Peter Frederik Ulrik Benzon (1760–1840) was a Norwegian civil servant and politician.  He served as the County Governor of Stavanger county starting in 1781. This was an unusual posting for a 21-year-old man, but he had connections in the royal court. He served in Stavanger until his resignation in 1785 due to his wife's health. It is said that she could not tolerate the colder climate in Stavanger and needed to go back to Denmark.

References

1760 births
1840 deaths
County governors of Norway